Pandanus subglobosus is a dioecious tropical shrub in the screwpine genus. It is endemic to Madagascar. The specific epithet, "subglobosus", refers to the nearly-round fruits. The accepted name for this species is now Pandanus oligocarpus.

Description
Pandanus subglobosus is a shrub with main stems green to gray, 5 – 7 m tall, 3 – 4 cm in diameter and studded with rough points. The stems are supported by numerous 2 – 3 m long prop roots that are about 2 cm in diameter. Leaves are up to 40 cm long and 4 – 7 mm wide, green above and pale below with dark green veins.

Flowers and fruit
Flower clusters develop at the tip of the stem. Female flower clusters produce a single, complex fruit, a syncarp, 3.5-4 cm in diameter. It is nearly round (globose) and made up of (5)-6-(7) green drupes.

Distribution and habitat
Infrequent in low scrub forests of dry sand plains. The species was first described in 1961, found along the northwest coast of Madagascar, in the Majunga area.

Taxonomy
Pandanus subglobosus is a member of the section Microstigma. Its closest relative is P. oligocarpus Martelli.

References

subglobosus